Lauderic Caton (31 August 1910 – 19 February 1999) was a Trinidadian guitarist who settled in Britain in 1940. He was an early proponent of the use of electric guitar in Britain, particularly in jazz music. According to Val Wilmer, "he exercised a significant influence on Pete Chilver and Dave Goldberg, the two jazz guitarists more generally credited as British pioneers of the amplified instrument, while his students, official and unofficial, ranged from jazz exponents to the Nigerian highlife specialist Ambrose Campbell and Hank Marvin of the Shadows."

Biography
Born in Arima, Trinidad and Tobago, Lauderic Rex Caton was the fourth son and last among the eight children of Robert Caton, who was of Saint Lucian descent, and Margaret Caton. 

Caton was an autodidact on guitar, which he played professionally from the age of 17. He was also proficient on saxophone, double bass, and banjo. After spending time in Guadeloupe and Martinique, he moved to Europe in 1938, playing in Paris with guitarist Oscar Alemán and then in Brussels with Ram Ramirez, Jean Omer, Harry Pohl, and Jamaican Joe Smith. While in Antwerp Caton played with Gus Clark and Tommy Brookins.

Influenced by Lonnie Johnson and Charlie Christian, Caton first began using an amplifier in May 1940. He played in England with Don Marino Barreto (in whose band he met and befriended saxophonist Louis Stephenson, a frequent collaborator) and led a house band at Jig's Club. He worked with Cyril Blake, Johnny Claes, Bertie King, Harry Parry, Dick Katz, and Coleridge Goode. Late in the 1940s Caton played with Ray Ellington and Ray Nance, playing under the pseudonym "Lawrence Rix" for legal reasons. Later in his life he also taught and built custom amplifiers.

He left music at the end of the 1950s. Caton was the musical arranger for Walking on Air.

Lauderic Caton died in London and was buried in Port of Spain.

References

1910 births
1999 deaths
Jazz guitarists
Trinidad and Tobago musicians
British people of Trinidad and Tobago descent
People from Arima
20th-century guitarists
Trinidad and Tobago people of Saint Lucian descent